was the founder and first shōgun of the Tokugawa Shogunate of Japan, which ruled Japan from 1603 until the Meiji Restoration in 1868. He was one of the three "Great Unifiers" of Japan, along with his former lord Oda Nobunaga and fellow Oda subordinate Toyotomi Hideyoshi. The son of a minor daimyo, Ieyasu once lived as a hostage under daimyo Imagawa Yoshimoto on behalf of his father. He later succeeded as daimyo after his father's death, serving as a vassal and general of the Oda clan, and building up his strength under Oda Nobunaga.

After Oda Nobunaga's death, Ieyasu was briefly a rival of Hashiba Hideyoshi, before declaring his allegiance and fighting on his behalf. Under Hashiba, Ieyasu was relocated to the Kanto plains in eastern Japan, away from the Hashiba power base in Osaka. He built his castle in the fishing village of Edo (now Tokyo). He became the most powerful daimyo and the most senior officer under the Toyotomi regime (Hideyoshi's new clan name). Ieyasu preserved his strength in Toyotomi's failed attempt to conquer Korea. After Hideyoshi's death, Ieyasu seized power in 1600, after the Battle of Sekigahara. He received appointment as shōgun in 1603, and voluntarily abdicated from office in 1605, but remained in power until his death in 1616. He implemented a set of careful rules known as the bakuhan system, designed to keep the daimyo and samurai in check under the Tokugawa Shogunate.

Background
During the Muromachi period, the Matsudaira clan controlled a portion of Mikawa Province (the eastern half of modern Aichi Prefecture). Ieyasu's father, Matsudaira Hirotada, was a minor local warlord based at Okazaki Castle who controlled a portion of the Tōkaidō highway linking Kyoto with the eastern provinces. His territory was sandwiched between stronger and predatory neighbors, including the Imagawa clan based in Suruga Province to the east and the Oda clan to the west. Hirotada's main enemy was Oda Nobuhide, the father of Oda Nobunaga.

Early life (1543–1556)

Tokugawa Ieyasu was born in Okazaki Castle on the 26th day of the twelfth month of the eleventh year of Tenbun, according to the Japanese calendar. His mother and father were step-siblings. They were 17 and 15 years old, respectively, when Takechiyo was born.

In the year of Takechiyo's birth, the Matsudaira clan was split. In 1543, Hirotada's uncle, Matsudaira Nobutaka defected to the Oda clan. This gave Oda Nobuhide the confidence to attack Okazaki. Soon afterwards, Hirotada's father-in-law died, and his heir, Mizuno Nobumoto, revived the clan's traditional enmity against the Matsudaira and declared for Oda Nobuhide as well. As a result, Hirotada divorced Odai-no-kata and sent her back to her family. Hirotada later remarried to different wives, and Takechiyo eventually had 11 half-brothers and sisters.

Hostage life
As Oda Nobuhide continued to attack Okazaki, Hirotada turned to his powerful eastern neighbor, Imagawa Yoshimoto for assistance. Yoshimoto agreed to an alliance under the condition that Hirotada send his young heir to Sunpu Domain as a hostage. Oda Nobuhide learned of this arrangement and had Takechiyo abducted. Takechiyo was five years old at the time. Nobuhide threatened to execute Takechiyo unless his father severed all ties with the Imagawa clan. However, Hirotada refused, stating that sacrificing his own son would show his seriousness in his pact with the Imagawa. Despite this refusal, Nobuhide chose not to kill Takechiyo, but instead held him hostage for the next three years at the Honshōji Temple in Nagoya. It is said that Oda Nobunaga met Takechiyo at this place, when Takechiyo was 6 years old, and Nobunaga was 14 at that time.

In 1549, when Takechiyo was 6, his father Hirotada was murdered by his own vassals, who had been bribed by the Oda clan. At about the same time, Oda Nobuhide died during an epidemic. Nobuhide's death dealt a heavy blow to the Oda clan.

In 1551, an army under the command of Imagawa Sessai laid siege to the castle where Oda Nobuhiro, Nobuhide's illegitimate eldest son was living. Nobuhiro was trapped by the Imagawa clan but was saved by Oda Nobunaga, Nobuhide's second son and heir, through negotiations. Sessai made an agreement with Nobunaga to take Takechiyo back to Imagawa, and he agreed. So Takechiyo (now nine years old) was taken as a hostage to Sunpu. At Sunpu, he remained a hostage but was treated fairly well as a potentially useful future ally of the Imagawa clan until 1556 when he was 14 years old.

Service under Yoshimoto (1556–1560)
In 1556, Takechiyo officially came of age, with Imagawa Yoshimoto presiding over his genpuku ceremony. He was also briefly allowed to visit Okazaki to pay his respects to the tomb of his father, and receive the homage of his nominal retainers, led by the karō Torii Tadayoshi.

A year later, their son, Matsudaira Nobuyasu, was born. He was then allowed to return to Mikawa Province. There, the Imagawa then ordered him to fight the Oda clan in a series of battles.

Motoyasu fought his first battle in 1558 at the siege of Terabe. The lord of Terabe, Suzuki Shigeteru, betrayed the Imagawa by defecting to Oda Nobunaga. This was nominally within Matsudaira territory, so Imagawa Yoshimoto entrusted the campaign to Motoyasu and his retainers from Okazaki. Motoyasu led the attack in person, but after taking the outer defences, he burned the main castle and withdrew. As anticipated, the Oda forces attacked his rear lines, but Motoyasu was prepared and drove off the Oda army.

He then succeeded in delivering supplies in the siege of Odaka a year later. Odaka was the only one of five disputed frontier forts under attack by the Oda clan which remained in Imagawa hands. Motoyasu launched diversionary attacks against the two neighboring forts, and when the garrisons of the other forts went to their assistance, Motoyasu's supply column was able to reach Odaka.

Death of Yoshimoto

By 1559 the leadership of the Oda clan had passed to Oda Nobunaga. In 1560, Imagawa Yoshimoto leading a large army of 25,000 men, invaded Oda clan territory. Motoyasu was assigned a separate mission to capture the stronghold of Marune. As a result, he and his men were not present at the Battle of Okehazama where Yoshimoto was killed in Nobunaga's surprise assault.

Early Rise (1560–1570)

Alliance with Nobunaga

With Imagawa Yoshimoto dead, and the Imagawa clan in a state of confusion, Motoyasu used the opportunity to assert his independence and marched his men back into the abandoned Okazaki Castle and reclaimed his ancestral seat. Motoyasu then decided to ally with Oda Nobunaga. A secret deal was needed because Motoyasu's wife, Lady Tsukiyama, and infant son, Nobuyasu, were held hostage in Sunpu by Imagawa Ujizane, Yoshimoto's heir.

In 1561, Motoyasu openly broke with the Imagawa and captured the fortress of Kaminogō. Kaminogō was held by Udono Nagamochi. Resorting to stealth, Motoyasu forces under Hattori Hanzō attacked under cover of darkness, setting fire to the castle, and capturing two of Udono's sons, whom he used as hostages to exchange for his wife and son.

In 1563, Matsudaira Nobuyasu, the first son of Motoyasu, was married to Oda Nobunaga's daughter Tokuhime.

Unification of Mikawa

In the February 1563, Matsudaira Motoyasu changed his name to Matsudaira Ieyasu. For the next few years Ieyasu was occupied with reforming the Matsudaira clan and pacifying Mikawa. He also strengthened his key vassals by awarding them land and castles. These vassals included Ōkubo Tadayo, Ishikawa Kazumasa, Kōriki Kiyonaga, Sakai Tadatsugu, Honda Shigetsugu, Amano Yasukage and Hattori Hanzō.

During this period, the Matsudaira clan also faced a threat from a different source. Mikawa was a major center for the Ikkō-ikki movement, where peasants banded together with militant monks under the Jōdo Shinshū sect, and rejected the traditional feudal social order. Ieyasu undertook several battles to suppress this movement in his territories, including the Battle of Azukizaka (1564).

Battle of Batogahara

On January 15, 1564, Ieyasu had decided to concentrate his forces to attack and eliminate the Ikkō-ikki from Mikawa. In the Ikkō-ikki ranks were some of Ieyasu's vassals, like Honda Masanobu and Natsume Yoshinobu, who had deserted him for the Ikkō-ikki rebellion out of religious sympathy.

Ieyasu was fighting in the front line and was nearly killed when struck by several bullets which did not penetrate his armour. Both sides were using the new gunpowder weapons which the Portuguese had introduced to Japan just 20 years earlier. At the end of battle, the Ikkō-ikki were defeated. 
By 1565, Ieyasu became master of all of Mikawa Province.

Tokugawa clan

In 1567, Ieyasu started the family name "Tokugawa", finally making his name to Tokugawa Ieyasu. As he was a member of the Matsudaira clan, he claimed descent from the Seiwa Genji branch of the Minamoto clan. However, there was no proof the Matsudaira clan are descendants of Emperor Seiwa. Though the Tokugawa could claim some modicum of freedom, they were very much subject to the requests of Oda Nobunaga. Ieyasu remained an ally of Nobunaga and his Mikawa soldiers were part of Nobunaga's army which captured Kyoto in 1568. At the same time, Ieyasu was eager to expand eastward to Tōtōmi Province. Ieyasu and Takeda Shingen, the head of the Takeda clan in Kai Province, made an alliance for the purpose of conquering all the Imagawa territory.

Tōtōmi campaign

In 1569, Ieyasu's troops penetrated into Tōtōmi Province. Meanwhile, Takeda Shingen's troops captured Suruga Province (including the Imagawa capital of Sunpu). Imagawa Ujizane fled to Kakegawa Castle, which led to Ieyasu laying siege to Kakegawa. Ieyasu then negotiated with Ujizane, promising that if Ujizane should surrender himself and the remainder of Tōtōmi, Ieyasu would assist Ujizane in regaining Suruga. Ujizane had nothing left to lose, and Ieyasu immediately ended his alliance with Takeda, instead making a new alliance with Takeda's enemy to the north, Uesugi Kenshin of the Uesugi clan. Through these political manipulations, Ieyasu gained the support of the samurai of Tōtōmi Province.

In 1570, Ieyasu established Hamamatsu as the capital of his territory, placing his son Nobuyasu in charge of Okazaki.

Ieyasu and Nobunaga (1570-1582)

Battle of Anegawa

In 1570, Azai Nagamasa, the brother-in-law of Oda Nobunaga, broke his alliance with the Oda clan during the siege of Kanegasaki. Soon Nobunaga was ready to punish Nagamasa for his treachery. Ieyasu led 5,000 of his men to support Nobunaga at the battle. The Battle of Anegawa occurred near Lake Biwa in Ōmi Province. The allied forces of Oda Nobunaga and Tokugawa Ieyasu defeated the combined forces of the Azai clan and Asakura clan, and saw Nobunaga's prodigious use of firearms. It is notable as the first battle that involved the alliance between Nobunaga and Ieyasu.

Conflict with Takeda

In October 1571, Takeda Shingen broke the alliance with the Oda-Tokugawa forces and now allied with the Odawara Hōjō clan. He decided to make a drive for Kyoto at the urgings of the shōgun Ashikaga Yoshiaki, starting with invading Tokugawa lands in Tōtōmi. Takeda Shingen's first objective in his campaign against Ieyasu was Nishikawa Castle, Yoshida Castle and Futamata Castle. In 1572, after besieging Futamata, Shingen would press on past Futamata towards the major Tokugawa home castle at Hamamatsu. Later, Ieyasu asked for help from Nobunaga, who sent him some 3,000 troops. Early in 1573 the two armies met at the Battle of Mikatagahara, north Hamamatsu. The considerably larger Takeda army, under the expert direction of Shingen, overwhelmed Ieyasu's troops and caused heavy casualties. Despite his initial reluctance, Ieyasu was convinced by his generals to retreat. The battle was a major defeat, but in the interests of maintaining the appearance of dignified withdrawal, Ieyasu brazenly ordered the men at his castle to light torches, sound drums, and leave the gates open, to properly receive the returning warriors. To the surprise and relief of the Tokugawa army, this spectacle made the Takeda generals suspicious of being led into a trap, so they did not besiege the castle and instead made camp for the night. This error would allow a band of Tokugawa soldiers to raid the camp in the ensuing hours, further upsetting the already disoriented Takeda army, and ultimately resulting in Shingen's decision to call off the offensive altogether. Takeda Shingen would not get another chance to advance on Hamamatsu, much less Kyoto, since he would perish shortly after the siege of Noda Castle later that same year.

Shingen was succeeded by his less capable son Takeda Katsuyori. In 1574, Katsuyori took Takatenjin fortress. Then, in 1575, during Takeda Katsuyori's raid through Mikawa Province, he attacked Yoshida Castle and besieged Nagashino Castle. Ieyasu appealed to Nobunaga for help and Nobunaga came personally with 30,000 strong men. The Oda-Tokugawa forces of 38,000 won a great victory and successfully defended Nagashino Castle. Though the Takeda forces had been destroyed, Katsuyori survived the battle and retreated back to Kai Province. For the next seven years, Ieyasu and Katsuyori fought a series of small battles, as the result of which Ieyasu's troops managed to wrest control of Suruga Province away from the Takeda clan.

In 1579, Lady Tsukiyama, Ieyasu's wife, and his heir Nobuyasu, were accused by Nobunaga of conspiring with Takeda Katsuyori to assassinate Nobunaga, whose daughter Tokuhime was married to Nobuyasu. For this reason, Ieyasu ordered his wife to be executed and forced his son to commit seppuku. Ieyasu then named his third son, Tokugawa Hidetada, as heir, since his second son had been adopted by Toyotomi Hideyoshi, who would later become an extremely powerful daimyo. 

In 1580, Oda-Tokugawa forces launched the second siege of Takatenjin; the siege came only six years after Takeda Katsuyori had taken the fortress. This second siege lasted from 1580 until 22 March 1581, and ended with the deaths of 680 men in the Okabe Motonobu garrison and the fall of the fortress to the Oda-Tokugawa forces.

The end of the war with Takeda came in 1582 when a combined Oda-Tokugawa force attacked and conquered Kai Province. Takeda Katsuyori was defeated at the Battle of Tenmokuzan, and then committed seppuku.

Death of Nobunaga

In late June 1582, before the incident at Honnō-ji temple, Oda Nobunaga invited Ieyasu to tour the Kansai region in celebration of the demise of the Takeda clan. When he learned that Nobunaga had been killed at the Honnō-ji temple by Akechi Mitsuhide, this meant that some provinces, ruled by Nobunaga's vassals, were ripe for conquest. Later, Ieyasu traveled back to Mikawa for gathering his forces. With the help of his retainer and ninja leader Hattori Hanzō, Ieyasu first went through Sakai, then crossed the mountains of Iga Province, finally reaching the shore in Ise Province. He returned to his home Mikawa Province by sea. Ieyasu was mobilizing his army when he learned that Toyotomi Hideyoshi had defeated Akechi Mitsuhide at the Battle of Yamazaki.

Ieyasu and Hideyoshi (1582–1598)
After the death of Oda Nobunaga at Honnō-ji temple, the lord of Kai Province made the mistake of killing one of Ieyasu's aides. Because of this, Ieyasu promptly invaded Kai and took control. Hōjō Ujimasa, leader of the Hōjō clan responded by sending his much larger army into Shinano Province and then into Kai Province. Later, both Ieyasu and the Hōjō clan agreed to a settlement which left Ieyasu in control of both Kai and Shinano provinces, while the Hōjō took control of Kazusa Province (as well as bits of both Kai and Shinano provinces).

In 1583, a war for rule over Japan was fought between Toyotomi Hideyoshi and Shibata Katsuie. Ieyasu did not take a side in this conflict, building on his reputation for both caution and wisdom. Hideyoshi defeated Katsuie at the Battle of Shizugatake. With this victory, Hideyoshi became the single most powerful daimyo in Japan.

Conflict with Hideyoshi

In 1584, Ieyasu decided to support Oda Nobukatsu, the eldest surviving son and heir of Oda Nobunaga, against Toyotomi Hideyoshi. This was a dangerous act and could have resulted in the annihilation of the Tokugawa clan, due to the fact that the Oda clan collapsed after Nobunaga's death.

Tokugawa troops took the traditional Oda stronghold of Owari. Hideyoshi responded by sending an army into Owari. The Komaki and Nagakute Campaign was the only time any of the great unifiers of Japan fought each other.

The Komaki and Nagakute Campaign proved indecisive and after months of fruitless marches and feints, Hideyoshi and Ieyasu settled the war through negotiations. First, Hideyoshi made peace with Oda Nobukatsu, and then he offered a truce to Ieyasu. The deal was made at the end of the year; as part of the terms Ieyasu's second son, Ogimaru (also known as Yuki Hideyasu) became an adopted son of Hideyoshi.

Ieyasu's aide, Ishikawa Kazumasa, chose to join the pre-eminent daimyo and so he moved to Osaka to be with Hideyoshi. However, few other Tokugawa retainers followed this example.

Alliance with Hideyoshi

Toyotomi Hideyoshi was understandably distrustful of Ieyasu, and five years passed before they fought as allies. The Tokugawa did not participate in Hideyoshi's successful Invasion of Shikoku (1585) and the Kyūshū Campaign (1587).

In 1590, Toyotomi Hideyoshi attacked the last independent daimyo in Japan, Hōjō Ujimasa. The Hōjō clan ruled the eight provinces of the Kantō region in eastern Japan. Hideyoshi ordered them to submit to his authority and they refused. Ieyasu, though a friend and occasional ally of Ujimasa, joined his large force of 30,000 samurai with Hideyoshi's enormous army of some 160,000. The Odawara campaign was the first battle of Ieyasu and Hideyoshi as allies. They attacked several castles on the borders of the Hōjō clan with most of their army laying siege to the castle at Odawara. Hideyoshi's and Ieyasu's army captured Odawara Castle after six months (oddly for the time period, deaths on both sides were few). During this siege, Hideyoshi offered Ieyasu a radical deal: He offered Ieyasu the eight Kantō provinces which they were about to take from the Hōjō in return for the five provinces that Ieyasu currently controlled (including Ieyasu's home province of Mikawa). Ieyasu accepted this proposal. Bowing to the overwhelming power of the Toyotomi army, the Hōjō accepted defeat, their leaders committed suicide and Ieyasu marched in and took control of their provinces, ending the clan's reign of over 100 years.

The Sannohe faction of Nanbu clan led by Nanbu Nobunao organized a coalition of most of the factions of the Nanbu clan and pledged allegiance to Toyotomi Hideyoshi at the siege of Odawara. In return, he was recognized as chieftain of the Nanbu clan, and confirmed as daimyo of his existing holdings in the northern districts of Mutsu Province. However, Kunohe Masazane (1536–1591), lord of Kunohe Castle and leader of the Kunohe faction of Nanbu clan, felt that he had a stronger claim to the title of clan chieftain, and immediately rose in rebellion. In 1591, Hideyoshi and Ieyasu took the Kunohe Rebellion as a personal affront to Toyotomi authority and by mid-year organized a retaliatory army to retake northern Tōhoku and to restore the area to Nanbu Nobunao's control.

Rise to power (1591–1599)

Daimyo of Kantō region

In 1591, Ieyasu now gave up control of his five provinces (Mikawa, Tōtōmi, Suruga, Shinano, and Kai) and moved all his soldiers and vassals to his new eight provinces at the Kantō region. He himself occupied the castle town of Edo in Kantō. This was possibly the riskiest move Ieyasu ever made—to leave his home province and rely on the uncertain loyalty of the formerly Hōjō samurai in Kantō. In the end however, it worked out brilliantly for Ieyasu. He reformed the Kantō region, controlled and pacified the Hōjō samurai and improved the underlying economic infrastructure of the lands. Also, because Kantō was somewhat isolated from the rest of Japan, Ieyasu was able to maintain a unique level of autonomy from Toyotomi Hideyoshi's rule. Within a few years, Ieyasu had become the second most powerful daimyo in Japan. There is a Japanese proverb which likely refers to this event: "Ieyasu won the Empire by retreating."

Korean Campaign

In 1592, Toyotomi Hideyoshi invaded Korea as a prelude to his plan to attack China. The Tokugawa samurai never actually took part in this campaign, though in early 1593, Ieyasu himself was summoned to Hideyoshi's court in Nagoya (in Kyūshū, different from the similarly spelled city in Owari Province) as a military advisor and given command of a body of troops meant as reserves for the Korean campaign. He stayed in Nagoya off and on for the next five years. Despite his frequent absences, Ieyasu's sons, loyal retainers and vassals were able to control and improve Edo and the other new Tokugawa lands.

In 1593, Toyotomi Hideyoshi fathered a son and heir, Toyotomi Hideyori. 

However, the cost of the Japanese invasions of Korea significantly weakened the Toyotomi clan's power in Japan.

Council of Five Elders

In 1598, with Toyotomi Hideyoshi's health clearly failing, Hideyoshi called a meeting that would determine the Council of Five Elders, who would be responsible for ruling on behalf of his son after his death. The five that were chosen as tairō (regent) for Hideyori were Maeda Toshiie, Mōri Terumoto, Ukita Hideie, Uesugi Kagekatsu, and Ieyasu himself, who was the most powerful of the five. This change in the pre-Sekigahara power structure became pivotal as Ieyasu turned his attention towards Kansai; and at the same time, other ambitious (albeit ultimately unrealized) plans, such as the Tokugawa initiative establishing official relations with New Spain (modern-day Mexico), continued to unfold and advance.

Death of Hideyoshi and Toshiie
Toyotomi Hideyoshi, after three more months of increasing sickness, died on September 18, 1598. He was nominally succeeded by his young son Hideyori but as he was just five years old, real power was in the hands of the regents. Over the next two years Ieyasu made alliances with various daimyo, especially those who had no love for Hideyoshi. Happily for Ieyasu, the oldest and most respected of the regents, Maeda Toshiie, died after just one year in 1599.

Unification of Japan (1599–1603)

Conflict with Mitsunari

With the death of Toyotomi Hideyoshi in 1598 and Maeda Toshiie in 1599, Ieyasu led an army to Fushimi and took over Osaka Castle, the residence of Hideyori. This angered the three remaining regents and plans were made on all sides for war.

Opposition to Ieyasu centered around Ishida Mitsunari, one of Hideyoshi's Go-Bugyō, or top administrators of Hideyoshi's government and a powerful daimyo who was not one of the regents. Mitsunari plotted Ieyasu's death and news of this plot reached some of Ieyasu's generals. They attempted to kill Mitsunari but he fled and gained protection from none other than Ieyasu himself. It is not clear why Ieyasu protected a powerful enemy from his own men but Ieyasu was a master strategist and he may have concluded that he would be better off with Mitsunari leading the enemy army rather than one of the regents, who would have more legitimacy.

Nearly all of Japan's daimyo and samurai now split into two factions—the Western Army (Mitsunari's group) and the Eastern Army (Ieyasu's group). Ieyasu supported the anti-Mitsunari group, and formed them as his potential allies. Ieyasu's allies were Katō Kiyomasa, Fukushima Masanori, Mogami Yoshiaki, Hachisuka Iemasa, the Kuroda clan, the Hosokawa clan and many daimyo from eastern Japan. Mitsunari allied himself with the three other regents: Ukita Hideie, Mōri Terumoto, and Uesugi Kagekatsu, as well as with Ōtani Yoshitsugu, Chosokabe clan, Shimazu clan and many daimyo from the western end of Honshū.

War became imminent when Uesugi Kagekatsu, one of Hideyoshi's appointed regents, defied Ieyasu by building up his military at Aizu. When Ieyasu officially condemned him and demanded that he come to Kyoto to explain himself, Kagekatsu's chief advisor, Naoe Kanetsugu, responded with a counter-condemnation that mocked Ieyasu's abuses and violations of Hideyoshi's rules, and Ieyasu was infuriated.

In July 1600, Ieyasu was back in Edo and his allies moved their armies to defeat the Uesugi clan, which they accused of planning to revolt against Toyotomi administration. On September 8, Ieyasu received information that Mitsunari had captured Fushimi castle and his allies had moved their army against Ieyasu. Ieyasu held a meeting with the Eastern Army daimyo, and they agreed to follow Ieyasu. Later on September 15, Mitsunari's Western army arrived at Ogaki Castle. On September 29, Ieyasu's Eastern Army took Gifu Castle. On October 7, Ieyasu and his allies marched along the Tōkaidō, while his son Hidetada went along through Nakasendō with 38,000 soldiers (a battle against Sanada Masayuki in Shinano Province delayed Hidetada's forces, and they did not arrive in time for the main Battle of Sekigahara). On October 20, Ieyasu's Eastern Army met Mitsunari's Western Army at Sekigahara, and on the following morning the battle began.

Battle of Sekigahara

The Battle of Sekigahara was the biggest and one of the most important battles in Japanese feudal history. It began on October 21, 1600. Initially, the Eastern Army led by Tokugawa Ieyasu had 75,000 men, while the Western Army numbered 120,000 men under Ishida Mitsunari. Ieyasu had also snuck in a supply of arquebuses. 

Knowing that the Tokugawa forces were heading towards Osaka, Mitsunari decided to abandon his positions and marched to Sekigahara. Even though the Western Army had tremendous tactical advantages, Ieyasu had already been in contact with many of the daimyo in the Western Army for months, promising them land and leniency after the battle should they switch sides, also having secretly communicated with Toyotomi Hideyoshi's nephew, Kobayakawa Hideaki. With a total of 170,000 soldiers facing each other, the Battle of Sekigahara ensued and ended with a complete Tokugawa victory. Later, the Western bloc was crushed and over the next few days Ishida Mitsunari and many other western nobles were captured and killed. Tokugawa Ieyasu was now the de facto ruler of Japan.

Immediately after the victory at Sekigahara, Ieyasu redistributed land to the vassals who had served him. Ieyasu left some western daimyo unharmed, such as the Shimazu clan, but others were completely destroyed. Toyotomi Hideyori (the son of Hideyoshi) lost most of his territory which were under management of western daimyo, and he was degraded to an ordinary daimyo, not a ruler of Japan. In later years the vassals who had pledged allegiance to Ieyasu before Sekigahara became known as the fudai daimyō, while those who pledged allegiance to him after the battle (in other words, after his power was unquestioned) were known as tozama daimyō. Tozama daimyō were considered inferior to fudai daimyō.

Shōgun (1603–1605)

On March 24, 1603, Tokugawa Ieyasu received the title of shōgun from Emperor Go-Yōzei. Ieyasu was 60 years old. He had outlasted all the other great men of his times: Oda Nobunaga, Takeda Shingen, Toyotomi Hideyoshi, and Uesugi Kenshin. As shōgun, he used his remaining years to create and solidify the Tokugawa shogunate, which ushered in the Edo period, and was the third shogunal government (after the Kamakura and the Ashikaga). He claimed descent from the Minamoto clan who had founded the Kamakura shogunate, by way of the Nitta clan. His descendants would marry into the Taira clan and the Fujiwara clan. The Tokugawa shogunate would rule Japan for the next 260 years.

Following a well established Japanese pattern, Ieyasu abdicated his official position as shōgun in 1605. His successor was his son and heir, Tokugawa Hidetada. There may have been several factors that contributed to his decision, including his desires to avoid being tied up in ceremonial duties, to make it harder for his enemies to attack the real power center, and to secure a smoother succession of his son. The abdication of Ieyasu had no effect on the practical extent of his powers or his rule; but Hidetada nevertheless assumed a role as formal head of the shogunal bureaucracy.

Ōgosho (1605–1616)

Construction of Edo castle

Ieyasu retired to Sunpu Castle in Sunpu, but he also supervised the building of Edo Castle, a massive construction project which lasted for the rest of Ieyasu's life. The result was the largest castle in all of Japan, the costs for building the castle being borne by all the other daimyo, while Ieyasu reaped all the benefits. The central donjon, or tenshu, burned in the 1657 Meireki fire. Today, the Imperial Palace stands on the site of the castle.

In 1611, Ieyasu, at the head of 50,000 men, visited Kyoto to witness the enthronement of Emperor Go-Mizunoo. In Kyoto, Ieyasu ordered the remodeling of the Imperial Court and buildings, and forced the remaining western daimyo to sign an oath of fealty to him.

Relations with foreign powers

As Ōgosho, Ieyasu also supervised diplomatic affairs with the Netherlands, Spain, and England. Ieyasu chose to distance Japan from European influence starting in 1609, although the shogunate did still grant preferential trading rights to the Dutch East India Company and permitted them to maintain a "factory" for trading purposes.

From 1605 until his death, Ieyasu frequently consulted English shipwright and pilot, William Adams. Adams, a Protestant fluent in Japanese, assisted the shogunate in negotiating trading relations, but was cited by members of the competing Jesuit and Spanish-sponsored mendicant orders as an obstacle to improved relations between Ieyasu and the Roman Catholic Church.

Significant attempts to curtail the influence of Christian missionaries in Japan date to 1587 during the leadership of Toyotomi Hideyoshi. However, in 1614, Ieyasu was sufficiently concerned about Spanish territorial ambitions that he signed a Christian Expulsion Edict. The edict banned the practice of Christianity and led to the expulsion of all foreign missionaries. Although some smaller Dutch trading operations remained in Nagasaki, this edict dramatically curtailed foreign trade and marked the end of open Christian witness in Japan until the 1870s. The immediate cause of the prohibition was the Okamoto Daihachi incident, a case of fraud involving Ieyasu's Catholic vavasour, but the shogunate was also concerned about a possible invasion by the Iberian colonial powers, which had previously occurred in the New World and the Philippines.

Conflict with Hideyori
 

The last remaining threat to Ieyasu's rule was Toyotomi Hideyori, the son and rightful heir to Hideyoshi. He was now a young daimyo living in Osaka Castle. Many samurai who opposed Ieyasu rallied around Hideyori, claiming that he was the rightful ruler of Japan. Ieyasu found fault with the opening ceremony of a temple（Great Buddha of Kyoto） built by Hideyori; it was as if he prayed for Ieyasu's death and the ruin of the Tokugawa clan. Ieyasu ordered Hideyori to leave Osaka Castle, but those in the castle refused and summoned samurai to gather within the castle. Then in 1614, Tokugawa besieged the Osaka Castle against Hideyori.

Siege of Osaka
The Tokugawa forces, with a huge army led by Ieyasu and shōgun Hidetada, laid siege to Osaka Castle in what is now known as "the Winter Siege of Osaka". Eventually, the Tokugawa were able to force negotiations and an armistice after directed cannon fire threatened Hideyori's mother, Yodo-dono. However, once the treaty was agreed, the Tokugawa filled the castle's outer moats with sand so his troops could walk across. Through this ploy, the Tokugawa gained a huge tract of land through negotiation and deception that they could not through siege and combat. Ieyasu returned to Sunpu Castle, but after Toyotomi Hideyori refused another order to leave Osaka, Ieyasu and his allied army of 155,000 soldiers attacked Osaka Castle again in "the Summer Siege of Osaka".

Finally, in late 1615, Osaka Castle fell and nearly all the defenders were killed, including Hideyori, his mother (Toyotomi Hideyoshi's widow, Yodo-dono), and his infant son. His wife, Senhime (a granddaughter of Ieyasu), pleaded to save Hideyori and Yodo-dono's lives. Ieyasu refused and either required them to commit ritual suicide, or killed both of them. Eventually, Senhime was sent back to Tokugawa alive. With the Toyotomi line finally extinguished, no threats remained to the Tokugawa clan's domination of Japan.

Death

In 1616, Tokugawa Ieyasu died at age 73. The cause of death is thought to have been cancer or syphilis. The first Tokugawa shōgun was posthumously deified with the name Tōshō Daigongen, the "Great Gongen, Light of the East". (A Gongen is believed to be a buddha who has appeared on Earth in the shape of a kami to save sentient beings). In life, Ieyasu had expressed the wish to be deified after his death to protect his descendants from evil. His remains were buried at the Gongens' mausoleum at Kunōzan, Kunōzan Tōshō-gū. As a common view, many people believe that after the first anniversary of his death, his remains were reburied at Nikkō Shrine, Nikkō Tōshō-gū, and his remains are still there. Neither shrine has offered to open the graves, so the location of Ieyasu's physical remains is still a mystery. The mausoleum's architectural style became known as gongen-zukuri, that is gongen-style. He was first given the Buddhist name Tosho Dai-Gongen, then after his death it was changed to Hogo Onkokuin.

Era of Ieyasu's rule
Ieyasu ruled directly as shōgun or indirectly as ōgosho during the Keichō era (1596–1615).

Ieyasu's character

Tokugawa Ieyasu had a number of qualities that enabled him to rise to power. He was both careful and bold—at the right times, and in the right places. Calculating and subtle, Ieyasu switched alliances when he thought he would benefit from the change. He allied with the Later Hōjō clan; then he joined Toyotomi Hideyoshi's army of conquest, which destroyed the Hōjō; and he himself took over their lands. In this he was like other daimyo of his time. This was an era of violence, sudden death, and betrayal. He was not well liked nor personally popular, but he was feared and respected for his leadership and cunning. For example, he wisely kept his soldiers out of Hideyoshi's campaign in Korea.

He was capable of great loyalty: once he allied with Oda Nobunaga, he never went against him, and both leaders profited from their long alliance. He was known for being loyal towards his personal friends and vassals, whom he rewarded. He was said to have a close friendship with his vassal Hattori Hanzō. However, he also remembered those who had wronged him in the past. It is said that Ieyasu executed a man who came into his power because he had insulted him when Ieyasu was young.

Ieyasu protected many former Takeda retainers from the wrath of Oda Nobunaga, who was known to harbour a bitter grudge towards the Takeda. He managed successfully to transform many of the retainers of the Takeda, Hōjō, and Imagawa clans—all whom he had defeated himself or helped to defeat—into loyal vassals.  At the same time, he was also ruthless when crossed. For example, he ordered the executions of his first wife and his eldest son—a son-in-law of Oda Nobunaga; Nobunaga was also an uncle of Hidetada's wife Oeyo.

Ieyasu was cruel, relentless and merciless in the elimination of Toyotomi survivors after Osaka. For days, scores of men and women were hunted down and executed, including an eight-year-old son of Toyotomi Hideyori by a concubine, who was beheaded.

Unlike Toyotomi Hideyoshi, he harbored no desires to conquer outside of Japan—he only wanted to bring order and an end to open warfare, and to rule Japan.

While at first tolerant of Christianity, his attitude changed after 1613 and the executions of Christians sharply increased.

Ieyasu's favorite pastime was falconry. He regarded it as excellent training for a warrior. "When you go into the country hawking, you learn to understand the military spirit and also the hard life of the lower classes. You exercise your muscles and train your limbs. You have any amount of walking and running and become quite indifferent to heat and cold, and so you are little likely to suffer from any illness.". Ieyasu swam often; even late in his life he is reported to have swum in the moat of Edo Castle.

Later in life he took to scholarship and Confucian religion, patronizing scholars like Hayashi Razan.

Two of his famous quotes:

Life is like unto a long journey with a heavy burden. Let thy step be slow and steady, that thou stumble not. Persuade thyself that imperfection and inconvenience are the lot of natural mortals, and there will be no room for discontent, neither for despair. When ambitious desires arise in thy heart, recall the days of extremity thou hast passed through. Forbearance is the root of all quietness and assurance forever. Look upon the wrath of thy enemy. If thou only knowest what it is to conquer, and knowest not what it is to be defeated; woe unto thee, it will fare ill with thee. Find fault with thyself rather than with others.

The strong manly ones in life are those who understand the meaning of the word patience. Patience means restraining one's inclinations. There are seven emotions: joy, anger, anxiety, adoration, grief, fear, and hate, and if a man does not give way to these he can be called patient. I am not as strong as I might be, but I have long known and practiced patience. And if my descendants wish to be as I am, they must study patience.Thomas, J. E. (1996). Modern Japan: a social history since 1868, p. 4.

It is said that he fought, as a warrior or a general, in 90 battles.

He was interested in various kenjutsu skills, was a patron of the Yagyū Shinkage-ryū school, and also had them as his personal sword instructors.

Honours
 Senior First Rank (April 14, 1617; posthumously)

Parents and siblings

Parents

Siblings

Mother Side

Wives and Concubines

Children

Speculated Children

Adopted children

Ancestry

Honnōji theory
Among the many conspiracy theories surrounding the Honnō-ji Incident is Tokugawa Ieyasu's role in the event. Historically, Ieyasu was away from his lord at the time and, when he heard that Oda Nobunaga was in danger, he wanted to rush to his lord's rescue in spite of the small number of attendants with him. However, Honda Tadakatsu advised for his lord to avoid the risk and urged for a quick retreat to Mikawa Province. Hattori Hanzō led the way through Iga Province and they returned home by boat.

However, skeptics think otherwise. While they usually accept the historically known facts about Ieyasu's actions during Akechi Mitsuhide's betrayal, theorists tend to pay more attention to the events before. Ever since Tokugawa Ieyasu lost his wife and son due to Oda Nobunaga's orders, they reason, he held a secret resentment against his lord. Generally, there is some belief that he privately goaded Mitsuhide to take action when the two warlords were together in Azuchi Castle. Together, they planned when to attack and went their separate ways. When the deed was done, Ieyasu turned a blind eye to Mitsuhide's schemes and fled the scene to feign innocence. A variation of the concept states that Ieyasu was well aware of Mitsuhide's feelings regarding Nobunaga and simply chose to do nothing for his own benefit.

See also

 Shitennō (Tokugawa clan)
 East Asian age reckoning
 List of Tōshō-gū
 Testament of Ieyasu

References
Footnotes

Citations

Sources

Further reading
 Bolitho, Harold (1974). Treasures Among Men: The Fudai Daimyo in Tokugawa Japan. New Haven: Yale University Press. . .
 McClain, James (1991). The Cambridge History of Japan Volume 4. Cambridge: Cambridge University Press.
 McLynn, Frank (2008). The Greatest Shogun, BBC History Magazine, Vol. 9, No. 1, pp 52–53.
 あおもりの文化財 徳川家康自筆日課念仏 – 青森県庁ホームページ 
 Sansom, George (1961). A History of Japan, 1334–1615. Stanford: Stanford University Press. .
 Totman, Conrad D. (1967). Politics in the Tokugawa Bakufu, 1600–1843. Cambridge: Harvard University Press. .

External links
 The Christian Century in Japan, by Charles Boxer
 

1543 births
1616 deaths
16th-century Japanese people
17th-century shōguns
Bushido
Matsudaira clan
People from Okazaki, Aichi
Tairō
Tokugawa clan
Tokugawa shōguns
Toyotomi retainers
Warlords
Deified Japanese people